Gabriel Adolfo Risso Patrón (born 5 November 1995) is an Argentine professional footballer who plays as a left-back for Atlético Tucumán.

Career
Risso Patrón's career started in the youth of local club Ñuñorco, before he was signed by Belgrano in 2008. Two years later, Risso Patrón joined River Plate following a successful trial. Following a short stint with Defensores de Belgrano, he returned to Ñuñorco in 2015. Twelve months later, Atlético Tucumán completed the signing of Risso Patrón. He was an unused substitute once during the 2016–17 Argentine Primera División, which preceded his professional debut arriving in a Copa Sudamericana second stage first leg against Oriente Petrolero on 11 July 2017. Risso Patrón also appeared in the second leg with Oriente Petrolero.

Overall, his first four appearances in senior football all came in the 2017 Copa Sudamericana; as he also featured in the subsequent round of sixteen versus eventual winners Independiente. In the following September, Risso Patrón made another appearance against Independiente in the Copa Argentina prior to making his league bow in an Argentine Primera División fixture with Patronato on 22 September.

Career statistics
.

References

External links

1995 births
Living people
Sportspeople from Tucumán Province
Argentine footballers
Association football defenders
Argentine Primera División players
Atlético Tucumán footballers